The 81st Stryker Brigade Combat Team is a modular mechanized infantry brigade of the United States Army National Guard based in Washington, Oregon and California. On 9 July 2015 it was announced that the 81st Brigade would convert from being an Armored BCT to a Stryker BCT. 

In September 2016 the 81st Brigade began the transition to a Stryker Brigade Combat Team. From 2016 to 2021, the 81st Brigade was part of the 7th Infantry Division and wore the ‘Indianhead’ patch under the Associated Unit Program (AUP). However, with the end of the AUP, the brigade donned its original "Raven" patch again in September 2021. As of 2022, the 81st SBCT has changed its alignment from the 7th Infantry Division to the 36th Infantry Division.

Current composition

The 81st Stryker Brigade contains seven battalions and a headquarters company. It assumed its current organizational structure as of 9 July 2015, when the 81st Brigade converted from a mechanized to a Stryker brigade and some units are attached to 2nd Infantry division which includes the 1-185th Infantry.

  Headquarters and Headquarters Company (HHC), 81st Stryker BCT – Seattle, Washington.
  1st Battalion, 161st Infantry Regiment 
 HHC Spokane
 Company A (Infantry) Redmond
 Company B (Infantry) Moses Lake
 Company C (Infantry) Spokane
 Detachments of these companies are located in Yakima, and Wenatchee
  3rd Battalion, 161st Infantry Regiment
 HHC Kent
Company A (Infantry) Anacortes
 Company B (Infantry) Kent
 Company C (Infantry) Redmond
  1st Battalion, 185th Infantry Regiment (California National Guard)
 HHC San Bernardino
 Company A Bakersfield and Porterville
 Company B Colton
 Company C Palmdale
  1st Squadron, 82nd Cavalry Regiment (Oregon National Guard)
  2nd Battalion, 146th Field Artillery Regiment
 Headquarters and Headquarters Battery Tumwater
 Detachment 1 Moses Lake, Washington
 Detachment 2 San Bernardino, California
 Battery A Moses Lake, Washington
 Battery B Tumwater, Washington
 Battery C Tumwater, Washington.
 181st Brigade Support Battalion
 HHC Interbay, Seattle
 A Supply and Transportation Company Interbay, Seattle
 B Maintenance Company Interbay, Seattle
 C Medical Company Interbay, Seattle
 D Forward Support Company (FSC) Prineville, Oregon (Oregon National Guard)
 E FSC Marysville
 F FSC Tumwater 
 G FSC Ephrata
 H FSC Barstow, California (California National Guard)
 I FSC Kent
 898th Brigade Engineer Battalion (formerly 81st Brigade Special Troops Battalion)
 HHC Marysville
 A Engineer Company Yakima
 B Engineer Company
 C Signal Company Marysville
 D Military Intelligence Company Kent
The brigade normally conducts its annual training at the Yakima Training Center, near Yakima, Washington.

History

World Wars 

The 81st Infantry Brigade was constituted as part of the 41st Infantry Division on 1 April 1917, consisting of the 161st and 162nd Infantry Regiments. The 41st deployed to France, but was designated a replacement division, with its infantry components sent to the 1st, 2nd, 32nd and 42nd Infantry Divisions.

Between the wars, the brigade joined the rest of the division in the Pacific Northwest, the headquarters moving with the home of the current brigade commander.

In January 1942, the 41st Infantry Division was reorganized from a two-brigade, four-regiment structure to a three-regiment structure with no brigade echelon. The 81st ceased to exist and its two component regiments split up. The 161st went to the 25th Infantry Division while the 162nd remained in the 41st Infantry Division, where they both saw extensive combat.

Cold War 

As part of an Army reorganization, the 81st was revived as a separate light infantry brigade on 1 January 1968 under Brigadier General Albert Kaye and built around the three battalions of the 161st Infantry Regiment. In 1971, the brigade converted to mechanized infantry, substituting one infantry battalion with 1st Battalion, 303rd Armor.

In subsequent years, the brigade was consecutively "affiliated" with the 9th Infantry Division and 4th Infantry Division before finally becoming the "roundout brigade" for the 9th Division and wearing its patch instead of the separate brigade patch. In 1991, the 9th Division was deactivated and the 81st was a separate brigade once again, tasked to augment the 2nd Infantry Division in the Republic of Korea in wartime.

Like many National Guard units, the 81st Brigade has been activated for state duty several times to respond to disasters and disorder. It responded to floods in December 1975 and November 1990, the 1980 eruption of Mount St. Helens, forest fires in 1994 and many other years, and the WTO Riots of 1999.

Iraq (2004) 

The 3,600-member 81st, one of the United States Army's 15 National Guard "enhanced readiness" or E-brigades, was federalized in November 2003 to support Operation Iraqi Freedom under Brigadier General Oscar Hilman. Most of its troops conducted pre-mobilization training at Fort Lewis, WA and the National Training Center and served in theater from March 2004 to March 2005. The brigade was broken up, and its components extensively reorganized under the 13th Corps Support Command (COSCOM) to meet the mission requirements:

A total of ten brigade soldiers died from enemy action over the course of the deployment, the majority of those from the 1st Battalion, 161st Infantry, the unit most directly involved in day-to-day combat operations. The 1st Battalion, 161st Infantry was responsible for the security and combat operations of a densely populated area of southeast Baghdad known as Al Zafranaya and Jsr Diayla. The battalion operated primarily out of Forward Operating Base Gunner (later renamed to FOB Highlander in honor of the battalion's nickname), Baghdad, Iraq. For its performance in combat, the 1–161st Infantry was awarded the Meritorious Unit Citation by the Department of the Army.

Upon its return from overseas in March 2005, the brigade began to reorganize in accordance with the Army's new "Unit of Action" Brigade design, adopting the organization it has today.

Between deployments, the brigade responded to floods in Southwest Washington caused by the Great Coastal Gale of 2007.

Iraq (2008) 

The 81st Brigade was alerted for a deployment in support of Operation Iraqi Freedom. It received its mobilization order on 19 March 2008 from the Department of Defense. The brigade completed pre-deployment training at Fort McCoy, WI and then deployed to Iraq from August 2008 to August 2009. The main focus of the brigade in OIF was security and "force protection operations."

The brigade was led into Iraq by Colonel Ronald Kapral and State Command Sergeant Major Robert Sweeney. During their time in Iraq, the brigade was visited by Washington state Governor Christine Gregoire and Washington Adjutant General, Brigadier General Toney. It suffered one fatality during its deployment, Specialist Samuel D. Stone, in a vehicle accident while on patrol.

Troop A, 1st Squadron, 303rd Cavalry Regiment received the Distinguished Service Unit award. The award was received on behalf of the unit by Captain Patrick Gehring and First Sergeant Travis Wise.

The brigade has shifted mobilization affiliation several times since the 1990s. It had been associated with the 2nd Infantry Division in South Korea. With the shift to being an armored brigade in 2005, it was affiliated for mobilization purposes to the 40th Infantry Division. From 2015 to 2021, the 81st SBCT was affiliated with the JBLM-based 7th Infantry Division.

Notable members
 Laverne Parrish - Technician-4, a medic with 1st Battalion, 161st Infantry Regiment received the Medal of Honor for his valorous actions in the Philippine Campaign of WWII
 James Dalton II - Brigadier General, Commander of the 161st Infantry Regiment and later Deputy Commander of the 25th Infantry Division during the Pacific Campaigns of WWII. He was killed in action during Battle of Balete Pass on 16 May 1945. Posthumously awarded the Distinguished Service Cross, Silver Star and Purple Heart. One of 11 US General Officers Killed in Action during the Second World War.
Matthew Shea - Captain, 1st Battalion, 161st Infantry Regiment. Elected to the Washington House of Representatives from the 4th Legislative District 12 January 2009 to present. Deployed to both Bosnia (1999) and Iraq (2004) where he served as the Commander of HHC, 1-161 Infantry.
 Ryan G. Anderson - Specialist who attempted to provide relief to al-Qaeda

External links
81st Heavy Brigade Combat Team Homepage
The Institute of Heraldry: 81st Heavy Brigade Combat Team

References

Stryker 81
Stryker 81
Stryker 81
81
81
Military units and formations established in 1917